Long intergenic non-protein coding RNA 1157 is a protein that in humans is encoded by the LINC01157 gene.

References